The 2016 South American Futsal World Cup qualifiers was a men's futsal tournament that was used as the South American qualifying tournament to determine three of the four CONMEBOL teams in the 2016 FIFA Futsal World Cup final tournament in Colombia. The tournament was held in Asunción, Paraguay between 5–13 February 2016.

Champions Brazil, runners-up Argentina and third-placed Paraguay qualified for the 2016 FIFA Futsal World Cup as the CONMEBOL representatives, besides Colombia who qualified automatically as hosts.

Teams
All ten CONMEBOL member national teams participated in the tournament.

Note: Statistics start from 2012 when a separate qualifying tournament was held. Prior to 2012, the Copa América de Futsal was used as the CONMEBOL qualifying tournament for the FIFA Futsal World Cup.

Venues
The matches were played at the Polideportivo del Club Sol de América in Asunción.

Group stage
The draw of the tournament was held on 23 October 2015 during the CONMEBOL Futsal Committee meeting at the CONMEBOL headquarters in Luque, Paraguay. The ten teams were drawn into two groups of five teams. Each group contained one team from each of the five "pairing pots": Argentina–Paraguay, Brazil–Colombia, Chile–Venezuela, Peru–Uruguay, Bolivia–Ecuador. The schedule of the tournament was announced on 8 January 2016.

The top two teams of each group advanced to the semi-finals, while the remaining teams proceeded to the classification play-offs for fifth to tenth place. The teams were ranked according to points (3 points for a win, 1 point for a draw, 0 points for a loss). If tied on points, tiebreakers were applied in the following order:
Head-to-head result in games between tied teams;
Goal difference in all games;
Goals scored in all games;
Drawing of lots.

All times local, PYST (UTC−3).

Group A

Group B

Knockout stage
In the knockout stage, extra time and penalty shoot-out were used to decide the winner if necessary (no extra time was used in the classification play-offs for fifth to tenth place).

Bracket

Ninth place play-off

Seventh place play-off

Fifth place play-off

Semi-finals
Winners qualified for 2016 FIFA Futsal World Cup.

Third place play-off
Winner qualified for 2016 FIFA Futsal World Cup.

Final

Final ranking

Qualified teams for FIFA Futsal World Cup
The following four teams from CONMEBOL qualified for the FIFA Futsal World Cup.

1 Bold indicates champion for that year. Italic indicates host for that year.

References

External links 

Eliminatorias de Futsal, CONMEBOL.com

2016
Conmebol
2016 in futsal
Futsal
2016 Fifa Futsal World Cup qualification (Conmebol)
2016 in Paraguayan football
February 2016 sports events in South America
2010s in Asunción
Sports competitions in Asunción